The 1975–76 FA Trophy was the seventh season of the FA Trophy. The Final took place on 24 April 1976 with Scarborough beating Stafford Rangers 3-2 after extra time. The referee was Ron Challis of Tonbridge.

Preliminary round

Ties

Replays

2nd replays

First qualifying round

Ties

Replays

2nd replays

Second qualifying round

Ties

Replays

Third qualifying round

Ties

Replays

2nd replays

1st round
The teams that given byes to this round are Matlock Town, Morecambe, Scarborough, Stafford Rangers, Barrow, Telford United, Macclesfield Town, Hillingdon Borough, Wimbledon, Worcester City, Romford, Weymouth, Wigan Athletic, Bangor City, Bromsgrove Rovers, Burscough, Grantham, Buxton, Bedford Town, Dover, Hastings United, Stourbridge, Dartford, South Liverpool, Ashford Town (Kent), Kettering Town, Boston United, Gateshead United, Banbury United, Merthyr Tydfil, Burton Albion and Margate.

Ties

Replays

2nd replays

2nd round

Ties

Replays

2nd replays

3rd round

Ties

Replay

4th round

Ties

Replays

Semi finals

First leg

Second leg

Final

References

General
 Football Club History Database: FA Trophy 1975-76

Specific

1975–76 domestic association football cups
League
1975-76